The Roman Catholic Archdiocese of Camagüey (erected 1912 as the Diocese of Camagüey, elevated 1998) is a Metropolitan Archdiocese, responsible for the dioceses of Ciego de Avila, Cienfuegos and Santa Clara.

Ordinaries
Valentín Zubizarreta y Unamunsaga, OCD (1914–1922), appointed Bishop of Cienfuegos
Enrique Pérez-Serantes (1922–1948), appointed Archbishop of Santiago de Cuba
Carlos Riu-Anglés (1948–1964)
Adolfo Rodríguez-Herrera (1964–2002)
Juan García-Rodríguez (2002–2016), appointed Archbishop of San Cristobal de la Habana; elevated to Cardinal in 2019
Wilfredo Pino Estévez (2016–)

Auxiliary bishops
Adolfo Rodríguez Herrera (1963–1964), appointed Bishop here
Mario Eusebio Mestril Vega (1991–1996), appointed Bishop of Ciego de Ávila
Juan García-Rodríguez (1997–2002), appointed Archbishop here; future Cardinal

Other priests of this diocese who became bishops
Álvaro Julio Beyra Luarca, appointed Bishop of Santisimo Salvador de Bayamo y Manzanillo in 2007
Juan Gabriel Díaz Ruiz, appointed Bishop of Ciego de Ávila in 2017

References

Roman Catholic dioceses in Cuba
Christian organizations established in 1979
Roman Catholic dioceses and prelatures established in the 20th century
A